Salaga North is one of the constituencies represented in the Parliament of Ghana. It elects one Member of Parliament (MP) by the first past the post system of election. The Salaga North constituency is located in the East Gonja district of the Savannah Region of Ghana.

Boundaries 
The seat is located entirely within the East Gonja District of the Savannah region of Ghana.

Members of Parliament

Elections 
Alhassan Mumuni is the current MP for the Salaga North constituency.

See also 

 List of Ghana Parliament Constituencies
 East Gonja District

References

Parliamentary constituencies in the Savannah Region